Antarasu (Quechua anta copper, Ancash Quechua rasu snow, ice, mountain with snow, "snow-covered copper mountain", Hispanicized spelling Antarazo) is a mountain in the Chunta mountain range in the Andes of Peru, about  high. It is located in the Huancavelica Region, Castrovirreyna Province, Santa Ana District and in the Huancavelica Province, Huancavelica District. Antarasu lies west of the mountain Qarwarasu (Carhuarazo) of the Huancavelica Region and southwest of the mountain Wamanrasu.

See also 
 Qarwarasu
 Wamanrasu

References

Mountains of Peru
Mountains of Huancavelica Region